The Little Carp River is a  stream in Cheboygan County in the U.S. state of Michigan.

The river is also known as "Carp Creek" and "Carp River".

See also 
 Little Carp River, other streams with the same name
 Carp River (Michigan)

References 

Rivers of Michigan
Rivers of Cheboygan County, Michigan
Tributaries of Lake Huron